Asahikawa City General Gymnasium is an arena in Asahikawa, Hokkaido, Japan.

References

Basketball venues in Japan
Indoor arenas in Japan
Levanga Hokkaido
Sports venues in Hokkaido
Buildings and structures in Asahikawa
1979 establishments in Japan
Sports venues completed in 1979